The NCW Quebec Heavyweight Championship is a title contested in the Canadian wrestling promotion Northern Championship Wrestling.  It was originally established in 1992 as the Lutte Lanaudière Québéc Championship.  Frank Blues defeated Phil Bélanger on May 5, 1992 to become the first Lutte Lanaudière Québéc Champion.

Title history 

Combined reigns

See also
NCW Inter-Cities Heavyweight Championship

Notes

State professional wrestling championships
Northern Championship Wrestling championships
Heavyweight wrestling championships
1992 establishments in Quebec